Manuel Bravo Paredes (February 17, 1897 – November 7, 1974) was a Chilean footballer who competed in the 1928 Summer Olympics. During his career he played for Santiago Wanderers and the Chile national football team. He was also a goal scorer in the 1922 Copa América.

References

External links

 

1897 births
1974 deaths
Chile international footballers
Footballers at the 1928 Summer Olympics
Chilean footballers
Olympic footballers of Chile
Association football forwards
Santiago Wanderers footballers